Anthony Atkins (born 23 November 1929) was a Barbadian cricketer. He played in four first-class matches for the Barbados cricket team in 1958/59.

See also
 List of Barbadian representative cricketers

References

External links
 

1929 births
Possibly living people
Barbadian cricketers
Barbados cricketers
People from Saint Michael, Barbados